MCMXC a.D. is the debut studio album by the German musical project Enigma, led by Romanian-German musician Michael Cretu. It was released in Europe by Virgin Records on 3 December 1990, and in the United States by Charisma Records on 12 February 1991. Cretu became fascinated with mixing archaic sounds with modern music after producing German pop singer Sandra's song "Everlasting Love", for which he experimented with Gregorian chant. Following Michael Cretu and Sandra's marriage in 1988, Michael developed the idea of the musical project Enigma and recorded the album over the course of eight months in 1990 at A.R.T. Studios.

MCMXC a.D. combines new-age music with dance rhythms, as well as combining themes of religion and Gregorian chant with sexuality, for which the album received generally positive reviews from music critics. The Gregorian chant was taken from recordings by Capella Antiqua München, which resulted in the Munich-based choir's label, Polydor Germany suing Cretu and Virgin Records for infringing on its "right of personality". The case was dropped after Cretu agreed to pay compensation.

Commercially, MCMXC a.D. became a worldwide success, reaching the top 10 on record charts in 10 countries, including charting at number six in the United States, staying on the country's Billboard 200 chart for 282 weeks. It was certified quadruple platinum in the US by the Recording Industry Association of America (RIAA). Four singles from the album were released: "Sadeness (Part I)", "Mea Culpa (Part II)", "Principles of Lust", and "The Rivers of Belief". The lead single topped charts worldwide.

Background and release
In 1987, Michael Cretu worked with Sandra on her song "Everlasting Love". Cretu experimented with Gregorian chant while working on the song with Sandra, and the chants appeared at the beginning of her song. He would become fascinated with incorporating archaic sounds into contemporary songs. Michael Cretu married Sandra in 1988 and came up with the idea of a new-age musical project, which would become known as "Enigma". MCMXC a.D. was recorded in 1990 in eight months at A.R.T. Studios, Cretu's studio located on the Spanish island of Ibiza. Cretu conceived the album as one continuous song; his philosophy when creating it was, "Contrary to the usual record-company philosophy, people are open-minded and starved for something unique." Cretu produced MCMXC a.D., with creative input from Frank Peterson and Fabrice Cuitad.

The first song recorded for the album was "Sadeness (Part I)". After making the song, Michael told Sandra Cretu, "This will be a huge hit or nothing at all." "Sadeness (Part I)" was released as a single on 1 October 1990. Michael Cretu wanted to be anonymous and wished for the single not to be promoted. He believed that it was not important for consumers to know who the producer is and wanted them to buy the single for the music itself. Due to this, he was credited as Curly M.C., while Peterson was credited as F. Gregorian, and Cuitad was credited as David Fairstein. Virgin Records promoted the song with radio and club-play only. Despite having virtually no promotion, "Sadeness (Part I)" became an international hit and reached number one in Germany faster than any previous new release, and prior to the completion of its music video.

MCMXC a.D. was released in Europe by Virgin Records on 3 December 1990, and in the United States by Charisma Records on 12 February 1991. Cretu still wanted to remain anonymous, believing that the consumers would buy the album for the music itself. The three producers were credited on MCMXC a.D. under the same monikers as on "Sadeness (Part I)": Cretu as Curly M.C., Peterson as F. Gregorian, and Cuitad as David Fairstein.

Composition and lyrics

Overview

MCMXC a.D. is 40 minutes and 16 seconds long and is divided into seven tracks, two of which contain three separate songs each. The track "Principles of Lust" contains "Sadeness", "Find Love", and "Sadeness (Reprise)"; and "Back to the Rivers of Belief" contains "Way to Eternity", "Hallelujah", and "The Rivers of Belief". The album encompasses a range of genres, including new-age, worldbeat, and pop music; and it utilizes hip-hop and dance rhythms. The album is well known for its mixing of Gregorian chant and other religious overtones with sexuality; the lead single, "Sadeness (Part I)", being the prime example. It is a common misconception that, because "Sadeness (Part I)" employs Gregorian chants, the entire album contains such chants. In debunking this notion, Cretu stated that Sadeness' is only one piece of the puzzle." Larry Flick from Billboard further clarified, saying that "Mea Culpa" maintains the atmosphere of "Sadeness", but "without the aid of Gregorian chants." According to the Journal of Religion and Health, MCMXC a.D. follows the narrative of facing one's demons and making peace with them.

Songs
"The Voice of Enigma" was written solely by Cretu, and starts with a foghorn sound that is known as the "Enigma horn". After the foghorn, Sandra Cretu starts talking and invites the listener to relax and take a deep breath, while an environmental soundscape plays in the background. "The Principles of Lust" track employs a drumbeat throughout similar to the R&B 1989 song "Back to Life (However Do You Want Me)" by Soul II Soul, flute synth lines, and Cretu's whispers and "orgasmic breathing" that mark the song breaks. The first part, "Sadeness", includes a Gregorian chant taken from the track "Procedamus in pace!" from the 1976 album Paschale Mysterium by Capella Antiqua München. It also includes contributions from Fabrice Cuitad and Peterson. The song's French lyrics are a quizzical look at, and defense of, the 18th-century writer Marquis de Sade, who was notorious for writing literature delving into themes of sexual violence and domination.

"Callas Went Away" was written solely by Michael Cretu, and samples Maria Callas's singing. "Mea Culpa" was written by Cretu and Fabrice Cuitad and is a follow-up to "Sadeness". Like "Sadeness", "Mea Culpa" samples Gregorian chant from the Capella Antiqua München and thus evokes the same atmosphere. The song's theme "centers around guilt", according to the official Enigma website. "The Voice & the Snake", written by Cretu and Peterson, is based on the Book of Revelation. "Knocking on Forbidden Doors" was written solely by Cretu. The "Back to the Rivers of Belief" track's three songs were mainly written by Cretu, with the song "The Rivers of Belief"—which centers around the Indian river Ganges and differs from the other songs in being more soulful—including contributions from Fabrice Cuitad.

Singles
Four songs from MCMXC a.D. were released as singles. "Sadeness (Part I)", known as "Sadeness" in the album and the first part of "The Principles of Lust" track, was released as the lead single on 1 October 1990. The single has sold at least 7 million copies worldwide, and was the fastest German single to reach number one, the week of 12 November 1990. The Los Angeles Times reported that the single reached number one in at least 14 other countries. "Mea Culpa (Part II)", known as "Mea Culpa" in the album, was released as the second single on 17 April 1991, and reached number seven on both the German charts and on the Billboard Dance Club Songs chart. The song charted at number four in France, and received a gold certification from the French National Syndicate of Phonographic Publishing (SNEP). Cretu considers "Mea Culpa (Part II)" his favorite song from the album. "Principles of Lust" and "The Rivers of Belief" were both as singles released in 1991. The "Principles of Lust" single is the song "Find Love" renamed. The single charted at number 90 in Germany, number 59 in the UK, and number 29 in France. "The Rivers of Belief" single is the third song of the "Back to the Rivers of Belief" album track. The single charted in the United Kingdom at number 68, and in Sweden at number 37.

Critical reception

MCMXC a.D. was met with generally positive reviews from music critics. Danny Serbib of Colorado Springs Magazine said that by adding Gregorian chant to the album, "[Cretu had] redefined the possible future of popular music." Mikko Stübner-Lankuttis from Deutsche Welle put MCMXC a.D. at number one on his "The Top 10 albums from Germany", saying "His combination of new-age sounds with dance beats regularly took the project to the top of the international charts."

AllMusic critic Ned Raggett said, "Michael Crétu's attempt at fusing everything from easy listening sex music and hip-hop rhythms to centuries-old Gregorian chants could not have been more designed to tweak the nose of high art." Marisa Fox wrote, for Entertainment Weekly, that while the album doesn't have as many accessible hits as other ones, "[the] journey through what the group calls 'music, spirit, and meditation' is entrancing as well as provocative."

In contrast, Brian Bourke, in the Syracuse Herald-Journal, stated that "once the novelty of Enigma's approach wears off", the rhythms underneath the songs have a sameness that is "irritating" in his eyes, with the exception of "The Rivers of Belief". The Village Voice critic Robert Christgau asserted that the "mellow electrobeat and Gregorian fog" of "Sadeness (Part I)" "provide[s] mutual relief", and suggested the other songs are disco filler with sexual content that is too lacking in vulgarity for his tastes.

Commercial performance
MCMXC a.D. was a worldwide commercial success. According to The New York Times, the album had sold 12 million copies worldwide as of February 1994. In Germany, MCMXC a.D. entered the German Albums chart at number 60 for the week of 10 December 1990. It peaked at number three for the week of 24 December 1990 and left after appearing at number 72 for the week of 8 July 1991. The album re-entered the chart at number 68 for the week of 21 February 1994 and left after appearing at number 69 for the week of 21 March 1991. MCMXC a.D. re-entered the German Albums chart at number 80 for the week of 9 December 1996 and left after appearing at number 73 for the week of 13 January 1997. The album spent 46 weeks on the German chart, and has been certified double platinum by the Bundesverband Musikindustrie (BVMI), indicating shipments in excess of one million copies in Germany.

In the US, MCMXC a.D. entered the Billboard 200 at number 169 for the week of 2 March 1991. It stayed on the Billboard 200 for 262 weeks, peaking at number six for the week of 3 May 1991. On the US Top Catalog Albums chart, MCMXC a.D. peaked at number four for the week of 10 May 1997. The album has since been certified quadruple platinum by the Recording Industry Association of America (RIAA), denoting shipments in excess of four million copies in the US.

MCMXC a.D. topped the UK Albums Chart for the week of 20 January 1991, spending 60 weeks on the chart. The album has since been certified triple platinum by the British Phonographic Industry (BPI) for shipments in excess of 900,000 copies in the UK. Elsewhere, MCMXC a.D. reached number one in Belgium, Greece, Portugal, and Spain; number two in Australia, New Zealand, and Switzerland; number three in Austria, Canada, and Sweden; number four in Ireland and Norway; and number seven in the Netherlands.

Controversies

Satanism rumors
Because MCMXC a.D. has themes of balancing good with evil, Cretu has been accused of putting satanic content into the album. Many of the accusations were concerned with the Gregorian chant being satanic. This resulted in many Catholic-backed radio stations in Europe banning "Sadeness (Part I)" from being played. While most of the press did not think that MCMXC a.D had satanic implications, Charisma Records issued a press release denying such claims. Cretu stated that he did not mean for there to be any implications of satanism with the album, revealing he wanted the combination of Gregorian chant and lyrics relating to the Marquis de Sade to be seen as a paradox.

Lawsuit
In a 1990 interview with Verdens Gang, Cretu claimed that the Gregorian chants used on MCMXC a.D. were recorded in Romania and said that the singers were given their share of the "D-marks" Cretu got from "Sadeness" and the album. This proved to be false; in 1991 Capella Antiqua München, a Munich-based choir, recognized a sample of one of their recordings on MCMXC a.D. Their label, Polydor Germany, sued Cretu and Virgin Records for infringing on its "right of personality" in using the Gregorian chant samples in "Sadeness (Part I)" and "Mea Culpa". The lawsuit was settled out of court after Virgin publicly apologized for the infringement and Cretu agreed to pay compensation to the original creator of the samples.

Track listing

Personnel
Credits adapted from the liner notes of MCMXC a.D.
 Michael Cretu (credited as "Curly M.C.") (all tracks)
 Frank Peterson (credited as "F. Gregorian") (tracks 2a, 2c, and 5)
 Fabrice Cuitad (credited as "David Fairstein") (tracks 2a, 2c, 4, and 7c)
 Sandra Cretu (uncredited) (tracks 1, 2a, 2c, and 4)

Charts

Weekly charts

Year-end charts

Certifications

Notes

References

External links
 Details of the release of MCMXC a.D. in different countries
 Lyrics to the songs in the album

1990 debut albums
Charisma Records albums
Enigma (German band) albums
Music controversies
Virgin Records albums